Zabrus mateui is a species of ground beetle in the Epomidozabrus subgenus that is endemic to Spain.

References

Beetles described in 1980
Beetles of Europe
Endemic fauna of Spain
Zabrus